is the 22nd single by Japanese idol girl group Nogizaka46. It was released on 14 November 2018. It reached number one on the weekly Oricon Singles Chart with 1.063 million copies sold, and also debuted at number one on the Billboard Japan Hot 100. It marks Nanase Nishino's graduation from the group.

Release 
This single was released in 5 versions. Type-A, Type-B, Type-C, Type-D and a regular edition.

Track listing
All lyrics written by Yasushi Akimoto.

Type-A

Type-B

Type-C

Type-D

Regular edition

Participating members

"Kaerimichi wa Tōmawari Shitaku Naru" 
Center: Nanase Nishino

3rd Row: Yūri Saitō, Sayuri Inoue, Kaede Satō, Momoko Ōzono, Riria Itō, Mai Shinuchi, Kazumi Takayama 

2nd Row: Misa Etō, Manatsu Akimoto, Miona Hori, Yumi Wakatsuki, Minami Hoshino, Reika Sakurai, Sayuri Matsumura 

1st Row: Minami Umezawa, Mizuki Yamashita, Asuka Saitō, Nanase Nishino , Mai Shiraishi, Erika Ikuta, Yūki Yoda

Chart performance

Oricon

Billboard Japan

References

2018 singles
2018 songs
Japanese-language songs
Nogizaka46 songs
Oricon Weekly number-one singles
Song articles with missing songwriters
Songs with lyrics by Yasushi Akimoto